Supaya (also spelt suphaya) is the highest royal title for the Burmese royal princesses. The title is given only to the daughters of the Chief Queen, and those of blue-blooded queens. It is said that there were only 8 princesses given the title of Supaya during the reign of King Mindon.

Recipients
The awarded eight princesses during the reign of King Mindon are as follows.

Notes

See also 

 Burmese royal titles

References 

Orders, decorations, and medals of Myanmar
Royal titles